New York City THC is a handball club from New York City.

History
The club was found 1973 by United Nations employees.

Accomplishments

International
 :2019 North American and Caribbean Senior Club Championship
 :2021 North American and Caribbean Senior Club Championship
9th :2019 IHF Super Globe
8th :2019 IHF Women's Super Globe

National
Source:
USA Team Handball Nationals
Men's Elite Division
 : 2007, 2009, 2011, 2012, 2015, 2017, 2018
 : 2013, 2016, 2019
 : 2004, 2005, 2010
Men's Open Division I
 : 2000
 : 2013, 2018
 : 2017
Men's Open Division II
 : 2017
Women's Open Division
 : 2019
 : 1989, 2001, 2002, 2011, 2015, 2017, 2018
 : 2000, 2012, 2016
Canadian Nationals
Men's
 : 2014
International Copper Box
Men's
 : 1-time
Pan American Men's Club Handball Championship
5th place : 2016
Northeast Team Handball League
Division 1 (Men)
 : 2009-10, 2010–11, 2011–12, 2012–13, 2013–14, 2014–15, 2015–16, 2016–17, 2017–18, 2018–19
Division 2 (Men)
 : 2012-13, 2017–18
 : 2016-17
 : 2014-15
Women's Division
 : 2011-12, 2012–13, 2013–14, 2015–16, 2016–17, 2017–18, 2018–19
 : 2014-15

Roster

Men's team

Women's team

References

External links

Handball clubs established in 1973
1973 establishments in New York City
American handball clubs